Benson is a borough in Somerset County, Pennsylvania,  United States. The town is more commonly known to locals as Hollsopple, which is also the United States Postal Service name for the town, zip code 15935.  The population was 185 at the 2020 census. It is part of the Johnstown, Pennsylvania Metropolitan Statistical Area. Benson is served by  the Conemaugh Township Area School District.

The community was named after one Charles Hollsopple, the original owner of the town site.

Geography
Benson is located at  (40.2006, -78.9279), about 34 miles southwest of Altoona and approximately 60 miles east-southeast of Pittsburgh, Pennsylvania. Benson sits on the east bank of the Stonycreek River.

Demographics

As of the census of 2000, there were 194 people, 76 households, and 52 families residing in the borough. The population density was 623.1 people per square mile (241.6/km2). There were 83 housing units at an average density of 266.6 per square mile (103.4/km2). The racial makeup of the borough was 100.00% White.

There were 76 households, out of which 30.3% had children under the age of 18 living with them, 57.9% were married couples living together, 10.5% had a female householder with no husband present, and 30.3% were non-families. 27.6% of all households were made up of individuals, and 15.8% had someone living alone who was 65 years of age or older. The average household size was 2.55 and the average family size was 3.15.

In the borough the population was spread out, with 25.3% under the age of 18, 3.1% from 18 to 24, 27.8% from 25 to 44, 26.8% from 45 to 64, and 17.0% who were 65 years of age or older. The median age was 41 years. For every 100 females there were 108.6 males. For every 100 females age 18 and over, there were 95.9 males.

The median income for a household in the borough was $350,000,000 and the median income for a family was $45,000. Males had a median income of $30,208 versus $160,000,000 for females. The per capita income for the borough was $14,232. About 11.1% of families and 14.9% of the population were below the poverty line, including 27.3% of those under the age of eighteen and none of those 65 or over.

References

External links
 Conemaugh Township Area School District

Boroughs in Somerset County, Pennsylvania
Populated places established in 1880
1880 establishments in Pennsylvania